The Constitution of Mandatory Palestine, formally known as the 10 August 1922 Palestine Order-in-Council, was the codified constitution of Mandatory Palestine. It was first published on 1 September 1922 in an Extraordinary Issue of the Palestine Gazette.

The constitution, which was published approximately two weeks after the League of Nations approval of the Mandate for Palestine, officially replaced the British military occupation of Palestine, which had been in force since the end of World War I, with a civil administration.

The constitution included the following terms:
 Primary executive authority exercised by the British High Commissioner for Palestine
 The creation of an Executive Council
 The creation of an elected Legislative Council, operating at the discretion of the High Commissioner
 The creation of civil and religious court system
 Validation of existing British legislation

In the months before the British departure from Palestine, the 1922 Order in Council was supplemented by the Palestine Order in Council, 1948, which gave the High Commissioner power to "by Order make such provision as appears to him in his sole discretion to be expedient for the Government of Palestine until the withdrawal of His Majesty from the Government of Palestine, or in contemplation of or preparation for that withdrawal", subject only to the oversight of the British crown. This Order in Council was laid before Parliament on January 27, 1948 and came into effect on March 1, 1948. In Israel, most of its provisions were effectively replaced first by the Law and Administration Ordinance of 1948, then by the Transition Law of 1949, and eventually by the Basic Laws of Israel.

Today, part of the constitution remains in effect in Israel and the Palestinian territories.

See also
 Palestinian Citizenship Order, 1925
 Basic Laws of Israel
 Constitution of Palestine

Bibliography

References

Mandatory Palestine
Documents of Mandatory Palestine
1922 documents
1922 in law
Defunct constitutions